Jehlius is a genus of star barnacles in the family Chthamalidae. There are at least two described species in Jehlius.

Species
These species belong to the genus Jehlius:
 Jehlius cirratus (Darwin, 1854)
 Jehlius gilmorei Ross, 1971

References

External links

 

Barnacles